There are 17 named tributaries of the main stem of Fishing Creek, a  stream in Columbia County, Pennsylvania, in the United States and a tributary of the Susquehanna River. The creek also has numerous sub-tributaries. The watersheds of Little Fishing Creek and Huntington Creek, Fishing Creek's two largest tributaries, make up nearly 45 percent of the Fishing Creek watershed.

The tributaries of the main stem of Fishing Creek consist of nine creeks, three runs, one brook, and four hollows.

Main stem tributaries

Tributaries of Hemlock Creek

Tributaries of Little Fishing Creek

Tributaries of Green Creek

Tributaries of Huntington Creek

Tributaries of Coles Creek

Tributaries of East Branch Fishing Creek

Tributaries and sub-tributaries of Heberly Run

Tributaries of Sullivan Branch

References

Fishing Creek
Tributaries of Fishing Creek (North Branch Susquehanna River)
North Branch